Joy to the World is the first Christmas album and seventh overall studio album by American country music singer Faith Hill. It features the U.S. Adult Contemporary #1 hit, "A Baby Changes Everything". The album was certified Gold by RIAA on December 4, 2008, and as of November 2016, it has sold 762,000 copies in the US.

Background
A couple tracks from Joy to the World have been available as free downloads as part of special promotions. In late November, for a limited period of time, "Joy to the World" (single) was available for free digital download as part of a "holiday mixtape" created by Oprah Winfrey. For a week beginning on December 9, 2008, the song "O Holy Night was available for free digital download from iTunes as their "Holiday Single of the Week".

The album was also promoted by a concert appearance on PBS Soundstage. PBS said of the album, 

Two limited edition versions of the album with a bonus DVD were made available at Target and Walmart. The Target DVD features 40 minutes of live performance and interview from Hill's XM Artist Confidential concert that took place in October 2007. The Walmart DVD was made available in 2009, a year after the album's original release, and features 19 minutes of Soundcheck footage.

Track listing

Personnel

 Sam Bacco - percussion
 Jeff Bailey - trumpet
 Beth Beeson - french horn
 Steve Brewster - percussion
 Tom Bukovac - electric guitar
 Paul Bushnell - bass guitar
 David Campbell - string arrangements, conductor
 Keith Carlock - drums
 Alvin Chea - background vocals
 Mike Compton - mandolin
 Eric Darken - percussion
 Matt Davich - saxophone
 Tim Davis - vocal contractor, background vocals
 Stuart Duncan - fiddle
 Chris Dunn - trombone
 Shannon Forrest - drums
 John Gilutin - piano
 Carl Gorodetzky - string contractor
 Barry Green - trombone
 Mike Haynes - trumpet
 Faith Hill - lead vocals
 Prentiss Hobbs - trombone
 Dann Huff - electric guitar
 Pete Huttlinger - acoustic guitar
 Jack Jezzro - bass guitar
 Charlie Judge - keyboards
 Jennifer Kummer - french horn
 Lee Levine - clarinet
 Sam Levine - saxophone
 London Oratory School Schola - boys choir
 Gilbert Long - tuba
 Jim Lotz - bassoon
 David Loucks - background vocals
 Chris McDonald - trombone
 Jerry McPherson - electric guitar
 Metro Voices - choir
 Jeff Meyer - french horn
 Doug Moffet - saxophone
 The Nashville String Machine - strings
 Craig Nelson - bass guitar
 Jimmy Nichols - keyboards
 Jenny O'Grady - choir director
 Steve Patrick - trumpet
 Darryl Phinnessee - background vocals
 Ann Richards - flute
 Eric Rigler - tin whistle, Uillean pipes
 Bettie Ross - pipe organ
 David Schnaufer - dulcimer
 Robbie Shankle - saxophone
 Buddy Skipper - saxophone
 Calvin Smith - french horn
 Denis Solee - saxophone
 Ron Sorbo - percussion
 Neil Stubenhaus - bass guitar
 Bryan Sutton - acoustic guitar
 Bobby G. Taylor - oboe
 George Tidwell - trumpet
 Glenn Worf - upright bass
 Jonathan Yudkin - cello, celtic harp, fiddle, viola

Release history

Charts

Weekly charts

Year-end charts

Singles – Billboard (North America)

Certifications

References

External links
Amazon
Faithhill.com

Faith Hill albums
Albums produced by Dann Huff
Albums produced by Byron Gallimore
Warner Records albums
2008 Christmas albums
Christmas albums by American artists
Country Christmas albums